is a Japanese professional footballer who plays as a defender for FC Gifu.

References

External links

1995 births
Living people
Japanese footballers
Association football defenders
FC Gifu players
J2 League players
J3 League players